In the past years, a number of icebreakers have been proposed but not yet built in Canada.

Polar 8
In 1985 the Government of Canada announced plans to build a new icebreaker for the Canadian Coast Guard. The Polar 8 Project was cancelled in 1990 while still in the design stage. Instead,  underwent a major refit.

CCGS John G. Diefenbaker

Citations

References
 
 
 

Icebreakers of Canada
Proposed ships of the Royal Canadian Navy